Ypsolopha atrobrunnella is a moth of the family Ypsolophidae. It is known from the southern part of the Russian Far East and north-eastern China.

The length of the forewings is 8.1–8.4 mm.

The larvae feed on Crataegus maximowiczii and Pyrus species.

Etymology
The specific name atrobrunnella is derived from two Latin roots atro- and brunne-, collectively meaning "dark brown", and refers to the forewing coloration of the species.

References

Ypsolophidae
Moths of Asia